Robert Prill Hall (December 20, 1878 – December 1, 1950), was a professional baseball player who played infield and outfield  during the 1904 and 1905 seasons.  He was a utility player including games at right field, Center field, left field, first base, second base, shortstop, and third base. Bob played for the Philadelphia Phillies in 1904, and the New York Giants and Brooklyn Superbas in 1905. Hall made his debut on April 18, 1904. In 103 career games, he had 75 hits in 369 at bats, which is a .203 average. He had 2 home runs, 32 RBIs, and 13 stolen bases. Hall played in his final game on October 7, 1905, and died on December 1, 1950, in Wellesley, Massachusetts.

External links

1878 births
1950 deaths
Major League Baseball outfielders
Major League Baseball third basemen
Major League Baseball shortstops
Major League Baseball first basemen
Brooklyn Superbas players
New York Giants (NL) players
Philadelphia Phillies players
Baseball players from Baltimore
New Haven Blues players
New London Whalers players
Milwaukee Creams players
Baltimore Orioles (IL) players
Buffalo Bisons (minor league) players
Newark Indians players